Abbitt is an English surname. Notable people with the surname include:

 George Abbitt (1634–1689), was a founding settler of Norwalk, Connecticut
 Watkins Abbitt (1908–1998), American politician
 Watkins Abbitt Jr. (born 1944), American politician

References 

Surnames of English origin